The 1979–80 Israel State Cup (Gvia HaMedina) was the 41st season of Israel's nationwide football cup competition and the 26th after the Israeli Declaration of Independence.

The competition was won by Hapoel Kfar Saba who have beaten Maccabi Ramat Amidar 4–1 at the final.

Results

Fifth round

Sixth Round

Seventh Round

Round of 16

Quarter-finals

Semi-finals

Final

References
100 Years of Football 1906-2006, Elisha Shohat (Israel), 2006, p. 250
Cup (Page 7) Hadshot HaSport, 13.1.1980, archive.football.co.il 
Beitar Be'er Sheva - Bnei Nazareth 3-2 Maariv, 23.1.1980, Historical Jewish Press 
The lower divisions took Artzit to extra time and "penalties" in the sixth round Davar, 3.2.1980, Historical Jewish Press 
Cup (Pages 3-5) Hadshot HaSport, 16.3.1980, archive.football.co.il 

Israel State Cup
State Cup
Israel State Cup seasons